Nothing Left to Lose is an album released by Gary U.S. Bonds on the VitaPro label in 1996. It was produced by Yank Barry as a promotion for the Global Village Market initiative. The track "Young Blood" features a duet with Ben E. King, while "1950's Kind of Mood" appeared again on Bonds's live album From the Front Row... Live! in 2003. The liner notes do not contain any information about the musicians. The album had only a very limited release on CD and has not been reissued.

Track listing
All songs written by Gary U.S. Bonds.

 "Nothing Left to Lose" - 4:42
 "Give Me the Love" - 4:22
 "Can't Win for Losing" - 4:39
 "1950's Kind of Mood" - 4:11
 "Souvenirs" - 4:54
 "Young Blood" - 3:40
 "I Don't Need More Than That" - 4:40
 "Search & Seize Her" - 3:59
 "Vagabond Man" - 4:45

Personnel

Musicians:
Gary U.S. Bonds - lead vocals
Ben E. King - vocals ("Young Blood")

Production:
Yank Barry - producer
Gary U.S. Bonds - producer

References

External links
 

1996 albums
Gary U.S. Bonds albums